See How They Run is a 2022 comedy mystery film directed by Tom George, written by Mark Chappell and produced by Damian Jones and Gina Carter. The film stars Sam Rockwell, Saoirse Ronan, Adrien Brody, Ruth Wilson, Reece Shearsmith, Harris Dickinson and David Oyelowo.

See How They Run was theatrically released in the United Kingdom on 9 September 2022 and in the United States on 16 September 2022, by Searchlight Pictures. The film received positive reviews from critics and has grossed $22 million worldwide. It was nominated for Outstanding British Film at the 76th British Academy Film Awards.

Plot
In 1953 London, Agatha Christie's play The Mousetrap celebrates its 100th performance, and sleazy American director Leo Köpernick has been hired by producer John Woolf to direct the film adaptation. After Köpernick's drunken behaviour towards the female lead Sheila Sim leads to a fistfight with her husband and co-star Richard Attenborough, Köpernick is killed backstage by an unseen assailant.

Inspector Stoppard investigates the murder, shadowed by the inexperienced Constable Stalker. Everyone at the theatre is declared a suspect and a potential victim, including the play's producer Petula Spencer and Woolf's wife Edana Romney. Stoppard attempts to close the theatre until the murder is solved, but the Metropolitan Police Commissioner, Harold Scott, intervenes, assigning Stalker to assist in the investigation.

Stoppard and Stalker search Köpernick's room at the Savoy Hotel, finding his address book of women's details. The hotel manager recalls Köpernick's violent argument with screenwriter Mervyn Cocker-Norris, who admits to arguing with Köpernick over the director's vision for an action-packed ending for The Mousetrap film. Mervyn, who lives with his hot-headed "nephew" Gio, remembers a "plain woman" arriving at the hotel with Köpernick's son.

Stoppard and Stalker question Woolf, who was blackmailed by Köpernick after he discovered Woolf's affair with his assistant, Ann. Dennis, an usher at the theatre, offers an unhelpful description of a suspicious figure; Attenborough and Sim are questioned as well. Spencer explains that she optioned The Mousetraps film rights to Woolf, but he would be contractually unable to produce the adaptation until the show had closed.

At a pub, Stoppard bonds with Stalker and reveals that his unfaithful wife left him after having a child with another man. Driving a drunken Stoppard home, Stalker finds news articles and a picture of his ex-wife, fitting Mervyn's description of a "homely woman with glasses". Combined with Dennis' description, this leads Stalker to suspect Stoppard may be the killer, and she searches for his ex-wife in Köpernick's address book.

Stoppard and Stalker attend a performance of The Mousetrap, during which Mervyn, Woolf, Dennis, Gio and Stoppard leave the auditorium; Stalker soon follows after watching Stoppard retrieve his gloves. In the foyer, Mervyn is strangled to death by a gloved figure. Stalker spots Stoppard kneeling over the body and gives chase, knocking him unconscious with a snow shovel.

Stoppard awakens in a cell, and Stalker and Scott accuse him of carrying out the murders. Stalker has summoned Joyce, the mother of Köpernick's son, but she is not Stoppard's ex-wife, exonerating him. Stalker escorts Joyce and her son home, and Joyce mentions overhearing a man with a "village idiot" accent. Reading through Mervyn's research on The Mousetrap, Stoppard realises the identity of the killer and races to the suspect's apartment, where Stalker has already burst inside and found the necessary evidence: the killer is Dennis.  

Attenborough, Sim, Woolf, Ann, Spencer and her elderly mother arrive at the home of Agatha Christie in Wallingford, Berkshire, having received invitations to dinner. The butler Fellowes is perplexed by their arrival, but Christie's husband, Max Mallowan, allows them inside. The group are held at gunpoint by Dennis, whom Spencer's mother recognises as Dennis Corrigan, an abused child whose brother's death inspired the plot of The Mousetrap. Dennis explains that he killed Köpernick and Mervyn in an attempt to stop the play and its adaptation, disgusted by the exploitation of his brother's tragedy for entertainment.

Having forged the invitations to lure everyone together, Dennis has captured Edana, mistaking her for Christie. Christie enters with tea, including a poisoned cup for Dennis which Fellowes inadvertently drinks instead. An armed Stoppard arrives and a shootout ensues; Sim distracts Dennis with a molotov cocktail, and Stalker nearly takes a bullet to save Stoppard, matching Köpernick's story pitch, before Agatha dispatches Dennis with a shovel. It is revealed that the bullet did, in fact, hit Stoppard, though the shot was not fatal. Some time later, Stalker passes her sergeant's exams and a recovering Stoppard receives the King's Police and Fire Services Medal, and they attend another performance of The Mousetrap together.

Cast

Production
The film was announced in November 2020 as an untitled mystery film from Searchlight Pictures, with Tom George on board to direct from a screenplay by Mark Chappell. Filming wrapped by April 2021. The title was revealed to be See How They Run in July 2021.

Release
See How They Run was released theatrically in the UK on 9 September 2022, and in the US on 16 September. The film was originally set for a 30 September release in the US, but was brought forward by two weeks due to "the lack of major studio product" late in the year.

The film was released for video on demand platforms on 1 November 2022.

Reception

Box office 
See How They Run grossed $9.6 million in the US and Canada, and $12.4 million in other territories, for a worldwide total of $22 million.

The film made $1.1 million on its first day and went on to debut to $3.1 million from 2,404 cinemas, finishing fourth at the box office. The film made $1.9 million in its second weekend and $1 million in its third.

Streaming viewership 
According to the streaming aggregator JustWatch, See How They Run was the 8th most streamed film across all platforms in the United States, during the week of 31 October to 6 November 2022, and the 10th during the week of 7 November to 13 November 2022.

Critical response 
The review aggregator website Rotten Tomatoes sampled 190 critics and judged 75% of the reviews positive, with an average rating of 6.5/10. The website states the film "may not do itself many favors by asking for Christie comparisons, but this is still one fun whodunit".  Audiences polled by CinemaScore gave the film an average grade of "B–" on an A+ to F scale.

Teo Bugbee of The New York Times praised the film calling it "a plummy affair, a proper figgy pudding baked out of once-stale Scotland Yard tropes." Nell Minow of RogerEbert.com gave the film two and a half stars saying "all the stylishness and enthusiasm cannot disguise the fact that the mystery itself never comes close to those concocted by Dame Agatha."

References

External links
 
 
 
 

2022 films
2022 comedy films
2022 directorial debut films
2020s American films
2020s British films
2020s comedy mystery films
2020s English-language films
American comedy mystery films
British comedy mystery films
Cultural depictions of Agatha Christie
Films about theatre
Films scored by Daniel Pemberton
Films set in 1953
Films set in Berkshire
Films set in London
Murder mystery films
Searchlight Pictures films
TSG Entertainment films